The Henry Viscardi Achievement Awards were established to honor the legacy of the founder of the Viscardi Center, Dr. Henry Viscardi, Jr., a leading disability rights advocate who wore prosthetic limbs. These international Awards, first conferred in 2013, recognize exemplary leaders in the disability sector around the globe who have had a profound impact on changing the lives of people with disabilities and championing their rights. Considered as most prestigious, these global awards honor champions of disability activism.

List of awardees

References

See also

 List of awards for contributions to society
 Viscardi center
 Henry Viscardi, Jr.
 Henry Viscardi School
 John D. Kemp

Health and disability rights organizations in the United States
Disability rights organizations
Awards for contributions to society
Humanitarian and service awards